Cadiz (Spanish: Cádiz) is an unincorporated community in the Mojave Desert in San Bernardino County, California, United States. It is located just south of the Marble Mountains near the National Trails Highway. Cadiz was a water stop on the railroad.

History
The town was named in 1883 by Lewis Kingman, a locating engineer for the Atlantic and Pacific Railroad. It is the third in a string of alphabetically named railroad stations in the Mojave Desert.

Climate
This area has a large amount of sunshine year round due to its stable descending air and high pressure.

The Cadiz Valley area overlies a large aquifer.

Cadiz, Inc., a Los Angeles-based land and water-resource-management company, owns more than  around Cadiz. It has plans to sell water from the aquifer. Under a Trump Administration change of policy, the project would not have to undergo federal review. In 2022, officials at Biden’s Interior Department petitioned a federal judge to throw out project approvals issued in 2020.

Railroads
Cadiz is on the BNSF Railway's Southern Transcon line that runs from Los Angeles to Chicago. It was previously the Atchison, Topeka and Santa Fe Railway line.  From Cadiz, the Arizona & California Railroad runs over a former ATSF line to Phoenix via Parker, Arizona.

In September 2013, Cadiz, Inc. negotiated the Arizona & California Railroad for trackage rights for a tourist train operation between Cadiz and Parker. The train was projected to be powered by a steam locomotive, listing Santa Fe 3751 as the potential engine. The plans also required a new station and museum in Cadiz.

Cadiz Airstrip
The airstrip is accessible via a dirt road and has no buildings.

See also

 Bristol Dry Lake

References

 

Unincorporated communities in San Bernardino County, California
Populated places in the Mojave Desert
Unincorporated communities in California